The Division 1 Féminine, shortened as D1 Féminine or D1F, and currently known as D1 Arkema for sponsorship reasons, is the highest division of women's football in France. Run by the French Football Federation, the league is contested by twelve fully professional clubs.

Founded in 1974, the league has existed in its current format since 1992. Seasons run from September to June, with teams playing 22 games each totaling 132 games in the season. Most games are played on Saturdays and Sundays. Play is regularly suspended after the second week in December before returning in the third week of January. The Division 1 Féminine is ranked the best women's league in Europe according to UEFA 2019–20 women's association club coefficients.

Lyon is the club that has won the most first division titles (15); the club also holds the record for consecutive titles (fourteen).

History 

The Division 1 Féminine was originally created in 1918 and managed by the Fédération des Sociétés Féminines Sportives de France (FSFSF), a women's football organization in France that was led by women's football pioneer Alice Milliat. The league lasted for twelve seasons before disbanding due to the prohibition of women's football. In 1975, women's football was officially re-instated and the Division 1 Féminine returned with funding from the French Football Federation. Professionalism was introduced in 2009–10 season and female football players in France began signing professional contracts with their clubs at the same season, the most notable of which is Olympique Lyonnais.

In July 2022, it was announced that the Division 1 Féminine will feature in the FIFA 23 video game.

Competition format 

There are 12 clubs in the Division 1 Féminine. During the course of a season, usually from September to June, each club plays the others twice, once at their home stadium and once at that of their opponents, for a total of 22 games, though clubs are allowed to host "big" matches at the home venues of their male counterparts, such as when Paris Saint-Germain hosted Juvisy at the Parc des Princes during the 2009–10 season. The female leagues, until the 2016–17 season, were run similarly to the men's amateur leagues in France with teams receiving four points for a win and two points for a draw. one point was awarded for a loss however, the league now adopts the 3-1-0 system. the Teams are ranked by total points, then goal difference, and then goals scored. At the end of each season, the club with the most points is crowned champion. If points are equal, the goal difference and then goals scored determine the winner. If still equal, teams are deemed to occupy the same position. If there is a tie for the championship, for relegation, or for qualification to other competitions, a play-off match at a neutral venue decides rank. The two lowest placed teams are relegated to the Division 2 Féminine and the winners of the two groups in D2 Féminine are promoted in their place.

Between the years 2001–2004, the league adopted a playoff system. The top four clubs in the league table were inserted into a playoff table following the completion of the season with the winner being crowned champions. From 1974 to 1992, the league consisted of several groups with the winners of each group entering a playoff phase to determine the champion.

European qualification

Until the 2019–2020 edition, only the top two teams in the Division 1 Féminine qualify for the round of 32 of the UEFA Women's Champions League.

Since the 2020–2021 edition, as determined by the UEFA women's coefficient, the winner of the Division 1 directly qualifies for the group stage of the UEFA Women's Champions League, whereas the second team qualifies for the second round and the third team qualifies for the first round. As of today, the winner of the Challenge de France, the female equivalent of the Coupe de France, does not qualify for European competition.

Starting with the 2021–22 edition, as determined by the UEFA women's coefficient, the top three teams will qualify for the UEFA Women's Champions League.

Clubs

2022–23 Teams

The following 12 clubs compete in the Division 1 Féminine during the 2022–23 season.

Previous winners

Top scorers
Included in the table below is a list of the top scorers of each season, starting from the 2001–02 season. Information for previous seasons unavailable.

Awards

In addition to the winner's trophy and the individual winner's medal players receive, the National Union of Professional Footballers (UNFP) awards the UNFP Female Player of the Year award to the top female player of the league. The current winner of the award is German international and Lyon midfielder Dzsenifer Marozsán. Following the 2009–10 season, the French Football Federation, who oversee the league, also began awarding a Player of the Year trophy. The jury panel who decided the winner consists of the twelve managers in the D1 Féminine. The Division 1 Féminine Player of the Month award was added in 2020.

See also

Women's sports
Women's football in France
List of foreign Division 1 Féminine players

References

External links
  Official website
   FootoFéminin
  Official YouTube channel

 
Football leagues in France
Fra
Women's football competitions in France
Professional sports leagues in France
Sports leagues established in 1974
1974 establishments in France